Kieran Lee Phillips (born 13 August 2002) is an English professional footballer who plays as a forward for National League North club Gloucester City.

Career

Bristol Rovers
He signed his first professional contract in February 2020; a two-year contract with League One side Bristol Rovers. This came after interest from Premier League side Southampton with Rovers rejecting two bids for the highly-rated youngster.

He made his professional debut on 6 October 2020 as a substitute in a 1–1 EFL Trophy draw away to Oxford United winning a late penalty which was missed by Luke Leahy, before Rovers lost the resulting penalty shoot-out.

Chippenham Town (loan)
On 9 October 2020, Phillips joined National League South side Chippenham Town on loan until January 2021. Phillips made his debut the following day as a late substitute in a 1-0 win over Braintree Town.

Dorchester Town (loan)
On 10 September 2021, Phillips joined Southern Premier Division South side Dorchester Town on a one-month loan deal. He made his debut the following day, scoring a first-half brace in a 2–0 victory over Walton Casuals. Phillips returned to his parent club on 12 October 2021.

Swindon Supermarine (loan)
On 28 October 2021, Phillips joined seventh tier Swindon Supermarine on a one-month loan deal. Phillips made his debut against Dorchester on 6 November, making a goalscoring start to his loan-spell as he scored the only goal against his former club. After scoring seven goals in seven matches over the course of November, Phillips won the Swindon Supermarine Player of the Month award. On 8 December, Phillips extended his loan spell with the club until 1 January 2022. On 5 January, Phillips' loan deal was extended until the end of the season. Phillips' final game of his loan spell came in the 5–2 Wiltshire Premier Shield Final victory over Corsham Town, Phillips scoring the fourth goal.

Phillips was released at the end of the 2021–22 season.

Gloucester City
On 29 July 2022, Phillips joined National League North club Gloucester City following a successful trial period, linking up with former Bristol Rovers academy manager Lee Mansell. A successful October saw Phillips win the league's player of the month award having scored six goals in four matches.

Career statistics

References

External links
 
 

2002 births
Living people
English footballers
Footballers from Bristol
Association football forwards
Bristol Rovers F.C. players
Chippenham Town F.C. players
Dorchester Town F.C. players
Swindon Supermarine F.C. players
Gloucester City A.F.C. players
National League (English football) players
Southern Football League players